Vojin Popović, known as Vojvoda Vuk (9 December 1881 – 29 November 1916) was a Serbian voivode (military commander), who fought for the Macedonian Serb Chetniks (i.e. komiti) in the Struggle for Macedonia, and then the Serbian national army in the Balkan Wars and World War I.

Life

Vojin was born on 9 December 1881 at Sjenica, Kosovo Vilayet, Ottoman Empire (present-day southwestern Serbia). Shortly after his birth, the family moved to Kragujevac, where Vojin attended school. He chose a career in the military. On 3 November 1901, he became second lieutenant. He was among the first cheta (bands, 'čete') heading for Old Serbia, i.e. Makedonia (1905).

He was killed after being shot through the heart on top of the Staravinski vis near Gruništa, Novaci Municipality in skirmishes after the Battle of Kaymakchalan on 29 November 1916 during the height of World War I. There is a Monument to Vojvoda Vuk in Belgrade.

Legacy
 There is a Monument to Vojvoda Vuk in a Belgrade park called Proleće.

See also
 List of Chetnik voivodes

References

 Anonymous, "One eyewitness of the Vojvoda Vuk`s death speaks about his last minutes", Politika, 25 October 1936.
 Anonymous, „The monument to Vojvoda Vuk – Vojin Popović was unveiled in Belgrade“, Belgrade municipal newspapers, no. 10, October 1936, 780–781
 Danilo Šarenac, Tradition of the irregular troops: the monument to Vojvoda Vuk in Belgrade, in: The Collection Premises of the Memory, 2, Department for the History of Art at the Faculty of Philosophy, the University of Belgrade, Belgrade 2013, 49–65

Sources
 

1881 births
1916 deaths
People from Sjenica
People from Kosovo vilayet
Serbian military personnel of the Balkan Wars
Serbian people of World War I
Serbian military personnel killed in World War I
19th-century Serbian people
20th-century Serbian people
Emigrants from the Ottoman Empire to Serbia